Lochaber Camanachd is a shinty club based in Spean Bridge, Lochaber, Scotland.  The club's senior team play in the Marine Harvest Premiership while a reserve team plays in the North Division Two. Lochaber also field a woman's team.

History
The club was formed in 1946 from Brae Lochaber (formed 1887) and Spean Bridge (formed 1894).  The constituent clubs then split between 1949 and 1958 before amalgamating again in 1958.  These two clubs were very prominent in the first days of organised shinty. Brae won the MacTavish Cup thrice in the 1920s .

The club became a strong force in shinty again in the early 2000s, knocking out Kingussie from the Camanachd Cup quarter finals in 2004 and gaining promotion to the Premier Division the same year.  However, its stay was short-lived and they were relegated in 2005 to North Division One.  However, the club made another quick return to the Premier in 2007 after winning Division One.  The second team also won North Division Three in 2006.  The club flirted with relegation in 2008 but the club survived under manager Michael Delaney. Ally Ferguson was appointed to the position of coach in December 2008.

Ferguson presided over the relegation of the club in December 2009 after the club was overhauled by both Inveraray and Bute. Lochaber's record of success in the Premier Division meant that they were considered the most likely winners of the North Division One in 2010.

Ferguson resigned along with his assistant Jason Latto in May 2010, leaving Lochaber with a management crisis after a steady start to the season.  He was replaced by Michael Delaney, his immediate predecessor, in an attempt to stop Lochaber's season turning to crisis.

Delaney's efforts ensured that Lochaber was always in the running for promotion but was pipped by Kilmallie for the league title on the last day of the season.

Lochaber started strongly in 2011 but were beaten by Kinlochshiel to the league title, however 2012 has seen them start very well in the league and reach their first senior cup final since the 1946 merger, by reaching the MacTavish Cup Final.  They made up for a loss to Newtonmore in that final by defeating Beauly in the Balliemore Cup.  They also won the North Division One and provided Shaun Nicolson and Neil MacDonald to the Scotland team.

Spean Bridge regularly played host to the Marine Harvest Festival of Shinty with the showpiece game between North District and South District. This tournament has gone into abeyance since 2008.

External links
Lochaber @ shinty.com
Ferguson Appointed

Shinty teams
Lochaber
Sport in Highland (council area)
1946 establishments in Scotland
Sports clubs established in 1946